When launched in 1853, Great Republic was the largest wooden ship in the world. She shared this title with another American-built ship, the steamship Adriatic. She was also the largest full-rigged ship ever built in the United States.
She was built by Donald McKay for trade on his own account to Australia.

Just as she was completing loading in New York for her first commercial trip, she was involved in a disastrous fire. She was scuttled to try to save the hull, with only limited success. McKay decided to abandon the wreck to his insurers, who sold the damaged hull to new owners, who rebuilt her with three decks instead of four. She was employed on trans-Atlantic and California routes, with a period under contract to the French government for the Crimean War. She was never used on Australian routes.

Even in her rebuilt form, Great Republic had difficulty accessing many ports when fully loaded, due to her great size. She regularly had to partially unload into lighters so that she could then enter locked basins to finish unloading. She did make the fast passages expected of her by McKay – so vindicating the design concept.

Construction

Designed by naval architect and shipbuilder Donald McKay as a four-deck four-masted medium clipper barque, Great Republic—at 4,555 tons registry—was intended to be the most profitable wooden sailing ship ever to ply the Australian gold rush and southern oceans merchant trade. The ship's launch was planned for September 4, 1853—builder Donald McKay's birthday—but it was postponed to October 4 due to problems with the timber supplies. The City of Boston made the launch a public holiday. Between 30,000 and 50,000 spectators attended, among them Ferdinand Laeisz of the Flying P-Line of Hamburg. The ship was christened by Captain Alden Gifford using a bottle of pure Cochituate water. The ship's name was drawn from the title of a poem by Henry Wadsworth Longfellow. After outfitting, Great Republic sailed in ballast from Boston to New York, where in December 1853 her first cargo was loaded.

Great Republic required "1,500,000 feet of pine ... 2,056 tons of white oak, 336½ tons of iron, and 56 tons of copper" - about three times as much pine as was typically required for a large clipper ship.

The Essex Institute Historical Collections provide a very detailed description of Great Republic in Volume LXIII, published in 1927.

Fire and re-building
On December 26, 1853 a fire broke out in the buildings of the Novelty Baking Company on Front Street near the piers where Great Republic and several other wooden merchant vessels were moored. The fire quickly spread to the packet ship Joseph Walker, and to the clippers White Squall, Whirlwind, and Red Rover, with sparks from the fire showering onto the deck of the Great Republic, whose crew was mustered shortly after midnight to unsuccessfully dowse the sails. The first three ships were destroyed; Red Rover was damaged, and Great Republic burnt to near the waterline and was scuttled at dawn to save her hull at dock. Bloated by grain which burst her seams, Great Republic was declared a total loss, and Donald McKay, who was said never to have gotten over the tragic event, was compensated by insurers. The sunken hulk was sold by the insurance underwriters to Captain Nathaniel Palmer, working on behalf of A. A. Low and Bro., who salvaged and rebuilt it as a three-deck vessel with reduced masts.

Voyages
Still the largest clipper ship in the world at 3,357 tons registry, Great Republic, under command of Captain Joseph Lymburner, started back in merchant service on February 24, 1855. Her maiden voyage brought her to Liverpool in 13 days.

Great Republic was "chartered by the French Government to bring munitions and troops to the Crimea," and served in the general cargo and guano trades. In 1862 the fourth mast was removed and the others re-rigged, and the clipper became a three-masted full-rigged ship, a so-called three-skysail-yarder. In 1864 Captain Lymburner retired and the ship's registry moved to Yarmouth, Nova Scotia. In 1869 she was sold to the Merchants' Trading Company of  Liverpool and renamed Denmark. She continued sailing until March 5, 1872 when a hurricane off Bermuda caused the ship to leak badly and she was abandoned.

Records set
During her 19-year merchant career, Great Republic proved to be very fast under leading breeze conditions and often out-distanced the fastest merchant steamers on Mediterranean routes. Sailing around Cape Horn, Great Republic averaged  to set a record by logging  in a single day.

Comparison to other large wooden sailing ships
A wooden sailing vessel larger than Great Republic was launched nearly three decades earlier in June 1825: the 5,294-ton Baron of Renfrew was a disposable ship built for a single voyage from Quebec to London. There it would be dismantled and sold piecemeal to English shipbuilders at premium prices since large timbers were in short supply. The vessel itself was exempt from British taxes imposed on "oak and square pine timber cargoes" and thus gained an economic advantage. Unfortunately, Baron of Renfrew was wrecked as it was being towed toward London in a storm. Although reports differ, most indicate the timbers were recovered and sold, and the venture was ultimately successful. Nevertheless, when the British tax on timber cargoes was changed shortly afterwards, the economic advantage disappeared and disposable ship construction ceased.

Great Republic was the largest, but not the longest wooden sailing ship ever built. Despite her 400 ft length overall, the record of being the longest wooden ship is held by the six-masted schooner Wyoming built at the Percy & Small shipyard, Bath, Maine, in 1909.

Further reading
Francis B. C. Bradlee: The Ship Great Republic and Donald McKay Her Builder. The Essex Institute, Salem, MA, 1927. Reprint of the Historical Collections of the Essex Institute, Vol. LXIII.
Octavius T. Howe & Frederick C. Matthews: American Clipper Ships 1833–1858. New York 1926, pp. 33–35
Lubbock, Basil: The Down Easters. Brown, Son & Ferguson, Ltd., Nautical Publishers, Glasgow (1929); Reprinted 1953; pp. 49–53; p. 253
Richard McKay: Some Famous Sailing Ships and Their Builder Donald McKay. New York 1928, pp. 210–225
Duncan MacLean: Description of the largest ship in the world, the new clipper Great Republic, of Boston, designed, built and owned by Donald McKay and commanded by Capt. L. McKay. Illustrated with Designs of her Construction. Written by a sailor. Eastburn's Press, Boston 1853.  Available online.
"Barons of the Sea: And Their Race to Build the World's Fastest Clipper Ship" Book by Steven Ujifusa, Published July 17, 2018 by Simon Schuster

Notes

References
Great Republic on Nautica , checked 2009-01-29
Clipper ship history by Lars Bruzelius , checked 2007-08-22

External links

Figurehead from clipper ship Great Republic, Mystic Seaport
Model of Great Republic

 illustrated description of Great Republic

Individual sailing vessels
Age of Sail merchant ships of the United States
Merchant ships of the United States
Troop ships of France
Guano trade
Ships built in Boston
Ships designed by Donald McKay
1853 ships
Shipwrecks in the Atlantic Ocean
Maritime incidents in March 1872